Vasyl Illich Kasiyan (1 January 1896 – 26 June 1976) was a Soviet and Ukrainian painter, graphic, parliamentary, People's Painter of the USSR, academician of the Academy of Arts of the Soviet Union.

A native of Eastern Galicia, he was a World War I veteran. While studying in Academy of Fine Arts, Prague in 1920s, Kasiyan was a student of Czech painter Max Švabinský.

External links
 Vasyl Kasiyan in the Ukrainian Soviet Encyclopedia
 Yankovska, O.V. Kasiyan Vasyl Illich (КАСІЯН ВАСИЛЬ ІЛЛІЧ). Encyclopedia of History of Ukraine.

1896 births
1976 deaths
20th-century Ukrainian politicians
People from Sniatyn
People from the Kingdom of Galicia and Lodomeria
Academy of Fine Arts, Prague alumni
Communist Party of the Soviet Union members
Full Members of the USSR Academy of Arts
Second convocation members of the Verkhovna Rada of the Ukrainian Soviet Socialist Republic
Sixth convocation members of the Verkhovna Rada of the Ukrainian Soviet Socialist Republic
Seventh convocation members of the Verkhovna Rada of the Ukrainian Soviet Socialist Republic
Eighth convocation members of the Verkhovna Rada of the Ukrainian Soviet Socialist Republic
Ninth convocation members of the Verkhovna Rada of the Ukrainian Soviet Socialist Republic
Academic staff of the Kharkiv State Academy of Design and Arts
Academic staff of the National Academy of Visual Arts and Architecture
Heroes of Socialist Labour
People's Artists of the USSR (visual arts)
Recipients of the Order of Lenin
Recipients of the Order of the Red Banner of Labour
Recipients of the Shevchenko National Prize
Austro-Hungarian military personnel of World War I
Soviet illustrators
Soviet painters
Soviet printmakers
Ukrainian Austro-Hungarians
Ukrainian male painters
Ukrainian printmakers
Burials at Baikove Cemetery